William Taylor Stores is a historic building in Savannah, Georgia, United States. Located in Savannah's Historic District, the addresses of some of the properties are West Bay Street, above Factors Walk, while others solely utilize the former King Cotton warehouses on River Street. As of February 2022, these are the Chart House Seafood in the eastern section (completed in 1806), while Modern Travel Network and American Gift Shop occupy the western section (completed in 1818). It is the oldest surviving structure on today's River Street, the oldest ballast-stone cotton warehouse in the country, and stated by the Historic American Buildings Survey (HABS) as being significant as an "early example of a multi-storied river embankment storage warehouse".

The eastern section, today's 202 and 204, was formerly Southern Marine Supply Company Incorporated, while the western section, now 206, was known as the Taylor House at the time of its construction.

The buildings were partially destroyed by fire in 1885 and rebuilt the same year.

William Taylor
William Taylor (1769–1840), a merchant and slave owner, was a Scottish emigrant who initially moved to South Carolina. He married Mary Elizabeth Clayton Miller in Stateburg, South Carolina, in 1799. Taylor was a partner with both his brother-in-law and Andrew Low for a period. He was president of the Saint Andrew's Society, an organization that assisted Scottish immigrants to the United States. Upon Taylor's death in 1840, one of the executors of his will was William Washington, the father of Girl Scouts founder Juliette Gordon Low.

The Taylors had several children, although only two survived: Alexander Miller Taylor (1800–1829) and Elizabeth Ann Taylor Goodwin (1802–1882). Elizabeth survived her husband by six years (died in 1846).

Interior views

River Street façade

Barnard Street elevation

See also
Buildings in Savannah Historic District

References

External links
HABS photos of 204 West Bay Street from the 20th century

Commercial buildings in Savannah
Commercial buildings completed in 1806
Commercial buildings completed in 1818
Savannah Historic District